Mezzano is a commune in Trentino.

Mezzano may also refer to:

Mezzano, a frazione of the commune of Caserta, Italy
Lake Mezzano